We, the Accused is a British period crime television series which originally aired on BBC 2 in 5 episodes between 10 September and 8 October 1980. It is an adaptation of the 1935 novel of the same title by Ernest Raymond, itself inspired by the Doctor Crippen case.

Main cast

 Ian Holm as Paul Pressett
 Angela Down as Myra Bawne
 Iain Cuthbertson as  Chief Inspector Boltro
 Hugh Thomas as  Detective Sergeant Doyle
 Christopher Benjamin as Inglewood
 Brenda Cowling as Mrs. Briscoll
 Frank Gatliff as Doctor Waterhall
 Betty Hardy as Jane Presset
 David Lodge as Briscoll
 Julia McCarthy as Bessie Furle
 Alan Webb as  Aubrey Presset
 Elizabeth Spriggs as Eleanor Presset
 Tony Brooks as Reporter
 Debbie Farrington as Annie Mavis
 Edmund Kente as  Worksop 
 Nichola McAuliffe as  Lily Worksop
 Charles Gray as Sir Hayman Drewer
 Ysanne Churchman as  Edith Hanks
 Derek Farr as  Sir Kenneth Eddy
 Annie Hulley as Sarah
 Norman Mitchell as Crompton
 Ralph Nossek as Superintendent Kerslake
 Philip Stone as Reverend Hanks
 Michael Troughton as Mr. Cullingford
 Ruth Trouncer as  Lady Drewer
 John Woodnutt as Inspector Yatt

References

Bibliography
Baskin, Ellen . Serials on British Television, 1950-1994. Scolar Press, 1996.

External links
 

BBC television dramas
1980 British television series debuts
1980 British television series endings
1980s British drama television series
1980s British television miniseries
English-language television shows
Television shows based on British novels